Federico Maria Erba (born 4 June 1989) is an Italian footballer who plays for Roma.

Biography
A youth product of A.S. Roma, Erba left his hometown club on 18 July 2008, which he was loaned to Lanciano. In July 2009, Erba was sold to Serie B club Cesena.
After zero appearance with the Serie B champion, Roma bought him back in June 2010.

References

External links
 FIGC 
 

Italian footballers
A.S. Roma players
S.S. Virtus Lanciano 1924 players
A.C. Cesena players
Association football central defenders
Footballers from Rome
1989 births
Living people